The Carnet Mondain (French for Social Notebook) of Belgium is a directory featuring high society (nobility and upper bourgeoisie), Belgian or foreign, established in Belgium, as well as members of Belgian families established abroad. It is equivalent to the Social Register in the United States. Its tagline is "the Familial and Social Belgium" (French: la Belgique Familiale et Mondaine). It also publishes the coats of arms of these families, when armigerous.

History 
This work, which was an initiative of Prince Charles-Louis of Merode, has the advantage of clearly showing the ties of descent between people (up to two degrees). This directory coexists with the High Life de Belgique, which pursues similar objectives.

Admission 
Persons wishing to be registered, must submit a written candidacy request supported by three unrelated persons included in previous editions. These new applications are then submitted to the Carnet Mondain admissions committee, which rules in full independence.

See also 

 High Life de Belgique
 Social Register
 Burke's peerage
 Almanach de Bruxelles (defunct)
 Almanach de Gotha
 Libro d'Oro
 Belgian nobility
 Bourgeois of Brussels
 Seven Noble Houses of Brussels
 Belgian heraldry
 Kulavruttanta

References 

Social institutions
Upper class culture in Europe
Genealogy publications
Family history
Series of books
Publishing companies of Belgium
Directories